Otar Barkalaia (born 17 February 1984 in Tbilisi) is a Georgian rugby union player who plays as a fly-half.

Barkalaia played for Figeac, in France. He currently plays for VPC Andorra XV, in Andorra.

He has 37 caps for Georgia, since 2002, with 8 conversions, 10 penalties and 1 drop goal scored, 49 points in aggregate. He was called for the 2007 Rugby World Cup, playing two games. His greatest success as a player was the win at the Six Nations B for the 2008 edition.

References

External links

1984 births
Living people
Rugby union players from Georgia (country)
Rugby union fly-halves
Expatriate rugby union players from Georgia (country)
Expatriate rugby union players in Andorra
Expatriate rugby union players in France
Expatriate sportspeople from Georgia (country) in Andorra
Expatriate sportspeople from Georgia (country) in France
Rugby union players from Tbilisi
Georgia international rugby union players